Mahathir Mohamad, the fourth Prime Minister of Malaysia, formed the first Mahathir cabinet in 1981 after being invited by Tuanku Ahmad Shah to form a new government following the resignation of the previous Prime Minister, Hussein Onn. Hussein had presided over the second Hussein cabinet, a coalition government that consisted of members of the component parties of Barisan Nasional. It was the 9th cabinet of Malaysia formed since independence.

Composition

Full members
The federal cabinet consisted of the following ministers:

Deputy ministers

Composition before cabinet dissolution

Full members

Deputy ministers

See also
 Members of the Dewan Rakyat, 5th Malaysian Parliament
 List of parliamentary secretaries of Malaysia#First Mahathir cabinet

References

Cabinet of Malaysia
1981 establishments in Malaysia
1982 disestablishments in Malaysia
Cabinets established in 1981
Cabinets disestablished in 1982